Wil McCarthy (born September 16, 1966) is an American science fiction novelist, president and co-founder of RavenBrick (a solar technology company), and the science columnist for Syfy.  He currently resides in Colorado.  Rich Man's Sky won the 2022 Prometheus Award.

Wil McCarthy popularized the concept of programmable matter, which he calls wellstone.

Bibliography

Novels
 Murder in the Solid State (1996)  
 Bloom (1998) 
 Antediluvian (2019) 
 Rich Man's Sky (2021) 

 The Waisters
 Aggressor Six  (1994) 
 Flies from the Amber (1995) 
 The Fall of Sirius (1996) 

 The Queendom of Sol

 The Collapsium (2000) —Nebula Award nominee.
 The Wellstone (2003) 
 Lost in Transmission (2004) 
 To Crush the Moon (2005) —Nebula Award nominee.

Short fiction 
 "Amerikano Hiaika", Aboriginal Science Fiction, May/June 1991.
 "Dirtyside Down", Universe 3, 1994.
 "The Dream of Houses", Analog, November 1995. Locus recommended reading list.
 "The Dream of Castles", Analog, April 1997.
 "The Dream of Nations", Analog, October 1998. Locus recommended reading list.
 "Once Upon a Matter Crushed", Science Fiction Age, May 1999. Theodore Sturgeon Award Nominee. Locus recommended reading list. Became the first portion of The Collapsium.
 "No Job Too Small", Aboriginal Science Fiction, Spring 2001.
 "Pavement Birds", Analog, July/August 2002.
"He Died that Day, in Thirty Years", Once Upon a Galaxy, 2002
 "Garbage Day", Analog, December 2002. Became part of The Wellstone.

Non-fiction
 "Programmable Matter" (AKA "Programmable Matter: A Retrospective"), Nature, October 6, 2000. .
 "Ultimate Alchemy", Wired 9.10, October 2001
 Hacking Matter (2003), 
 "This Looks Like a Job for...Superatoms", IEEE Spectrum, August 2005

Other media

Radio plays
 I Love Bees, writer

Radio appearances
 Coast to Coast AM, "Programmable Matter", April 18, 2003
 Coast to Coast AM, "Quantum Dots", April 26, 2004

References

External links 
 WilMcCarthy.com
 
 
 Wil McCarthy U.S. patents

1966 births
Living people
20th-century American novelists
21st-century American novelists
American male novelists
American science fiction writers
American male short story writers
American nanotechnologists
Novelists from Colorado
Wired (magazine) people
20th-century American short story writers
21st-century American short story writers
20th-century American male writers
21st-century American male writers